Dolly Parton: A MusiCares Tribute is a 2021 American documentary film made for Netflix and produced by George Flanigen. The film presents the 2019 MusiCares Person of the Year concert where Dolly Parton became the first country artist to receive the honor. It was released on April 7, 2021.

References

External links 

2021 films
2021 documentary films
American documentary films
Documentary films about women in music
2020s English-language films
2020s American films